The 1998 Tasmanian state election was held on Saturday, 29 August 1998 in the Australian state of Tasmania to elect 25 members of the Tasmanian House of Assembly. The number of members was reduced from 35 to 25. The election used the Hare-Clark proportional representation system—five members were elected from each of five electorates. The quota required for election increased from 12.5% to 16.7%.

This election saw the end of two years of a Liberal minority government headed by Premier Tony Rundle, supported by the Tasmanian Greens. The Labor Party won government in its own right for the first time since 1979, with Jim Bacon as premier.

Labor retained all their seats despite the reduction in numbers. The Liberals lost six seats. The Greens' representation was reduced from four members to one—Peg Putt in Denison.

Results

|}

Primary vote by division

Distribution of seats

See also
 Candidates of the 1998 Tasmanian state election
 Members of the Tasmanian House of Assembly, 1998-2002

References
 Tasmanian Parliamentary Library: 1998 election results
 Voting by Division from Adam Carr's Electoral Archive
 Australian Parliamentary Library research note

Notes 

Elections in Tasmania
1998 elections in Australia
1990s in Tasmania
August 1998 events in Australia